Swindon Festival of Literature is an annual literature festival held in Swindon, Wiltshire, England.
It was founded in 1994 by Matt Holland of Lower Shaw Farm, its HQ, and Dominic Winter (1953 - 2014). 
For a quarter of a century, the Swindon Festival of Literature made May a high spot on Swindon’s cultural calendar. In 2019, to help Swindon celebrate all that it has to offer, and to offer all that it has to celebrate, in the arts, the Festival of Literature became the Swindon Spring Festival - of literature and the arts. 
The spoken and written word is still at the heart of the festival, with plenty of authors, talks, discussions, and workshops.
But the new-look festival also celebrates other art forms. It includes dance, drama, music, film, and circus performances from the Festival’s partners in Swindon and from artists and performers further afield.

References

External links 
 

Literary festivals in England
Festival of Literature
Festivals in Wiltshire